Pimelea approximans is a species of flowering plant in the family Thymelaeaceae and is endemic to northern Queensland. It is a perennial shrub with elliptic leaves and spikes of hairy, yellow, tube-shaped flowers.

Description

Taxonomy
Pimelea approximans  was first formally described in 2017 by Anthony Bean in the journal Austrobaileya from specimens collected at Ninian Bay in 1979. The specific epithet (approximans) refers to the similarity of this species to P. amabilis.

Distribution and habitat
This pimelea grows on in woodland or grassland on rocky hillsides, in the Bathurst Bay and Coen areas of north Queensland.

References

approximans
Flora of Queensland
Malvales of Australia
Plants described in 2017
Taxa named by Anthony Bean